James Wilkes Noble (March 5, 1922 – March 28, 2016) was an American actor, best known for his portrayal of sweet-natured, dense, naive Governor Eugene X. Gatling on ABC's 1979–1986 sitcom Benson.

Life and career
Noble was born in Dallas, Texas, the son of Lois Frances (née Wilkes) and Ralph Byrne Noble. He studied acting and engineering at Southern Methodist University before leaving to serve in the United States Navy during World War II.

Returning from the war, Noble studied acting under Lee Strasberg and made appearances in Broadway theatre, and his television career started in soap operas, such as The Brighter Day, As the World Turns, The Doctors as Dr. Bill Winters and A World Apart. His big screen roles included: Reverend John Witherspoon in the film version of the Broadway musical 1776 (1972); assorted roles as doctors in films such as One Summer Love (1976), 10 (1979) and Promises in the Dark (1979); Kaufman, the president's chief of staff, in Being There (1979); Father O'Flanagan in the comedy sequel Airplane II: The Sequel (1982); Sinclair in A Tiger's Tale (1987); Chief Wilkins in the comedy Paramedics (1988) and Dr. Bailey in Chances Are (1989). He was also the spokesman in various commercials for Pepto-Bismol in the 1970s.

Noble played the father of Larry Appleton in the 1980s sitcom Perfect Strangers (TV series). In 2005, he co-founded Open the Gate Pictures with actress Colleen Murphy, and produced and starred in the short film Glacier Bay, which won several awards at film festivals in the United States. Noble played the live-action version of Archie Comics character Hiram Lodge in the movie Archie: To Riverdale and Back Again (1990).

Personal life
Noble was married to actress Carolyn Coates from 1956 until her death in 2005. They had one child, a daughter.

Noble had lived with his family in Leonia, New Jersey before moving to California in 1980.

Death
Noble died on March 28, 2016 at the age of 94. A spokesman for Noble's family said that the actor had suffered a stroke the week before his death.

Filmography

References

External links

James Noble at the University of Wisconsin's Actors Studio audio collection
James Noble(Aveleyman)
James Noble on Find a Grave

1922 births
2016 deaths
Male actors from Dallas
United States Navy personnel of World War II
Military personnel from Texas
American male film actors
American male stage actors
American male television actors
American male soap opera actors
Southern Methodist University alumni
20th-century American male actors
21st-century American male actors
Actors from Norwalk, Connecticut
People from Leonia, New Jersey